Mahendra Karma (5 August 1950 – 25 May 2013) was an Indian political leader belonging to Indian National Congress from Chhattisgarh. He was the  leader of the opposition in the Chhattisgarh Vidhan Sabha from 2004 to 2008. In 2005, he played a top role in organising the Salwa Judum movement against Naxalites, a Maoist group in Chhattisgarh. He was a Minister of Industry and Commerce in the Ajit Jogi cabinet since the state formation in 2000 to 2004. He was assassinated by Naxalites on 25 May 2013 in a Maoist attack while returning from a Parivartan Rally meeting organised by his party in Sukma.

Early life and family
Karma was an ethnic Adivasi leader from the Bastar region. He was born on 5 August 1950 to Daraboda Karma in the Dantewada district who was himself a powerful, strong leader in the undivided Bastar region. He received his higher secondary education from Bastar Higher Secondary School, Jagdalpur in 1969 and completed his graduation from Danteshwary College in 1975. His elder brother Lakshman Karma had also been a Member of Parliament. Earlier, Naxalties had killed his brother Podiyaram who was president of the Bhairamgad Janpad Panchayat. They had also killed around 20 of his relatives in the subsequent period. His son Chavindra Karma was also Jila Panchayat Chairman of Dantewada and is in hit list of Maoist and Deepak Karma is currently (as of 2013), Nagar Panchayat president of Dantewada.

Politics
Karma started his political career with the Communist Party of India (CPI). He won the 1980 general elections on the ticket of CPI. Later on he joined the Indian National Congress. He was then elected as the first president of the Zila Panchayat of the undivided Bastar. In 1996 general elections, Karma was elected to the Loksabha as a Member of Parliament (MP) on an independent ticket from Bastar. Later on he returned to the Congress. He was elected as a Member of Legislative Assembly from Dantewada and was appointed as a Minister of Prisons in the Digvijaya Singh cabinet in the undivided Madhya Pradesh. He served as the Minister of Industry and Commerce after Chhattisgarh was carved out from its parent state Madhya Pradesh in the Ajit Jogi cabinet though he was known as a political adversary of Jogi. In 2003, his party Indian National Congress suffered defeat in the legislative assembly elections and he was made the leader of opposition in the state assembly. He used to represent Dantewada constituency. The congress again lost the 2008 assembly elections when BJP swept 10 out of the 11 seats in Bastar. He had secured 158,520 votes (35.19%). In the region, he was known as "Bastar Tiger"-for making a tough stand against the regional Maoist insurgency.

Anti-Naxal movement
Karma was seen as the driving force behind anti-Naxal movements in the Chhattisgarh. In 1991, he had started Jan Jagran Abhiyan which was composed mostly of traders and businessmen. The movement collapsed after sometime. Because of his role against Maoists, Karma was a high-value target. Owing to the threat perception to his life by the Maoists, he was given Z+ security for his protection.

Assassination
On 25 May 2013, Karma was killed in the Maoist attack in Darbha along with several other party leaders including Nand Kumar Patel when they were returning from a political rally.

On 27 May, the Naxalites claimed responsibility for the attack by issuing a statement which called the attack "the punishment for Salwa Judum founder Mahendra Karma for the atrocities done by the Salwa Judum-Nand Kumar Patel was suppressing people. It was in his tenure in the Center when paramilitary forces were deployed in the Bastar area."

The newly elected INC government of Chhattisgarh has set up an SIT under Vivekanand Sinha to probe into the incident on January 2, 2019.

See also
 List of assassinated Indian politicians

References

External links
 An article in Outlook
 News Website

2013 deaths
Chhattisgarh MLAs 2003–2008
Indian National Congress politicians from Chhattisgarh
Assassinated Indian politicians
Communist Party of India politicians from Chhattisgarh
Naxalite–Maoist insurgency
State cabinet ministers of Chhattisgarh
India MPs 1996–1997
People murdered in Chhattisgarh
Indian murder victims
Terrorism victims in India
Deaths by firearm in India
1950 births
Lok Sabha members from Chhattisgarh
People from Dantewada district
Leaders of the Opposition in Chhattisgarh
Adivasi politicians